Dalmatian may refer to:

 Dalmatia, a region mainly in the southern part of modern Croatia
 Dalmatian language, an extinct Romance language
 Dalmatian (South Slavic), one of the historical names for proto-Serbo-Croatian
 Dalmatian (dog), a breed of dog originating in this region
 Dalmatian (band), a South Korean boy band
 Dalmatian (EP), its self-titled EP
 Dalmatian pelican, a large bird native to central Europe

See also 
 Dalmatae, Ancient Illyrian tribe

Language and nationality disambiguation pages